Ta chvíle, ten okamžik (English title: That Instant, That While) is a 1981 Czech drama film directed by Jiří Sequens. It was entered into the 12th Moscow International Film Festival where it won a Special Prize.

Cast
 František Němec as MUDr. Kodet
 Daniela Kolářová as Helena
 Luděk Munzar as Baumann
 Ladislav Frej as Brázda
 Rudolf Jelínek as Frantisek
 Yevgeni Zharikov as Boris
 Vilém Besser as MUDr. Herman (as Míla Besser)
 Petr Svojtka as MUDr. Valsa
 Libuše Geprtová as Bela
 Jiří Strnad as Karlík
 Miluše Šplechtová as Nurse Vlasta

References

External links
 

1981 films
1981 drama films
1980s Czech-language films
Czech resistance to Nazi occupation in film
Czech drama films
Czech war drama films
Czech World War II films
Czechoslovak World War II films
1980s Czech films